IAJ may refer to:

Implant-abutment junction, the location of intimate contact between a dental implant and its restorative abutment
International Association of Judges a professional, non-political, international organization of national associations of judges
Institute for Alternative Journalism, former name of the  Independent Media Institute, founder of AlterNet
Interchange Association, Japan, former name of the Japan–Taiwan Exchange Association, which represents the interests of Japan in Taiwan